The 2019–20 season was Győri Audi ETO KC's 40th competitive and consecutive season in the Nemzeti Bajnokság I and 72nd year in existence as a handball club. The season got cancelled due to the COVID-19 pandemic.

Players

Squad information

Goalkeepers
 12  Amandine Leynaud
 16  Nikolett Tóth
 73  Éva Kiss
 85  Kari Aalvik Grimsbø
Left Wingers
 13  Anita Görbicz (c)
 23  Csenge Fodor 
 57  Szidónia Puhalák
Right Wingers
3  Jana Knedlíková 
 33  Bernadett Bódi
 48  Dorottya Faluvégi
Line players
2  Béatrice Edwige 
7  Kari Brattset Dale
 19  Diána Világos

Left Backs
8  Anne Mette Hansen
 18  Eduarda Amorim 
 21  Veronica Kristiansen 
Centre Backs
 15  Stine Bredal Oftedal
 20  Johanna Farkas
 27  Estelle Nze Minko
Right Backs
5  Laura Kürthi 
 24  Amanda Kurtović 
 32  Katarina Bulatović

Transfers
Source:  hetmeteres.hu

 In:
 Katarina Bulatović (from  Budućnost)
 Béatrice Edwige (from  Metz)
 Dorottya Faluvégi (from Ferencváros) 
 Amanda Kurtović (from  CSM București) 
 Estelle Nze Minko (from Siófok) 

 Out:
 Sára Afentaler (loan to Alba Fehérvár)
 Boglárka Binó (loan to Vasas) 
  Nycke Groot (to  Odense)
 Júlia Hársfalvi (to Siófok)
 Dóra Kellermann (loan to Mosonmagyaróvár) 
 Dorina Korsós (loan return to  TuS Metzingen) 
 Rita Lakatos (loan return to Vác) 
  Nora Mørk (to  CSM București)
 Tamara Pál (loan to MTK Budapest)
  Crina Pintea (to  CSM București)
 Zsuzsanna Tomori (to Siófok)
 Gabriella Tóth (loan return to Érd)

Club

Technical Staff

Source: Coaches, Management

Uniform
Supplier: Adidas
Main sponsor: Audi / tippmix / OTP Bank / City of Győr 
Back sponsor: PannErgy / Győrszol
Shorts sponsor: OMV / Leier / OIL!

Competitions

Overview

Nemzeti Bajnokság I

League table

Results by round

Matches

Results overview

Hungarian Cup

Matches

EHF Champions League

Group stage

Matches

Results overview

Main round

Matches

Results overview

Knockout stage

Quarter-finals

Statistics

Top scorers
Includes all competitive matches. The list is sorted by shirt number when total goals are equal.
Last updated on 7 March 2020

Attendances

List of the home matches:

References

External links
 
 Győri Audi ETO KC at eurohandball.com

 
Győri ETO